Francesco Margiotta (born 15 July 1993) is an Italian professional footballer who plays as a forward for  club Novara on loan from Latina.

Career
Born in Turin, Piedmont, Margiotta started his career at Serie A side Juventus, signing a four-year contract in 2011. In 2012, he was loaned to Carrarese. In 2013, Margiotta was loaned to Venezia. He also signed a new three-year contract with Juventus in 2013. In 2014, Margiotta was signed by Monza. In January 2015, Margiotta was loaned to Real Vicenza. In 2015 Margiotta moved to Santarcangelo on loan.

In June 2016, he moved to newly-promoted Swiss first division club Lausanne-Sport on an 18-month loan. The loan was made permanent on 31 January 2018 for €1 million. In June 2019 he signed for FC Luzern; he left the club in October 2020 after 13 goals in 39 games. Margiotta then joined ChievoVerona later that month.

After the exclusion of Chievo, Margiotta signed for A-League side Melbourne Victory at the start of the 2021–22 season. In August 2022, he returned to Italy, signing for Latina in the Serie C. On 31 January 2023, Margiotta was loaned to Novara, with an option to buy.

Honours
Melbourne Victory
 FFA Cup: 2021

References

External links
 
 AIC profile (data by football.it) 

1993 births
Living people
Footballers from Turin
Italian footballers
Association football forwards
Juventus F.C. players
Carrarese Calcio players
Venezia F.C. players
A.C. Monza players
Real Vicenza V.S. players
Santarcangelo Calcio players
FC Lausanne-Sport players
FC Luzern players
A.C. ChievoVerona players
Melbourne Victory FC players
Latina Calcio 1932 players
Novara F.C. players
Serie C players
Swiss Super League players
Swiss Challenge League players
Serie B players
A-League Men players
Italy youth international footballers
Italian expatriate footballers
Italian expatriate sportspeople in Switzerland
Italian expatriate sportspeople in Australia
Expatriate footballers in Switzerland
Expatriate soccer players in Australia